Nicolás Lapentti was the defending champion but lost in the third round to Mariano Zabaleta.

Àlex Corretja won in the final 6–4, 6–1, 6–3 against Juan Carlos Ferrero.

Seeds
A champion seed is indicated in bold text while text in italics indicates the round in which that seed was eliminated. All sixteen seeds received a bye to the second round.

  Albert Costa (quarterfinals)
  Juan Carlos Ferrero (final)
  Guillermo Cañas (second round)
  Andrei Pavel (quarterfinals)
  Nicolás Lapentti (third round)
  Gastón Gaudio (semifinals)
  Rainer Schüttler (second round)
  Àlex Corretja (champion)
  Marcelo Ríos (second round)
  Juan Ignacio Chela (quarterfinals)
  Stefan Koubek (third round)
  Mariano Zabaleta (semifinals)
  Agustín Calleri (second round)
  Hicham Arazi (second round)
  Julien Boutter (second round)
  Félix Mantilla (second round)

Draw

Finals

Top half

Section 1

Section 2

Bottom half

Section 3

Section 4

References
 2002 Generali Open Draw

Austrian Open Kitzbühel
2002 ATP Tour